An epithet is a name. In taxonomic nomenclature, it is a word or phrase (epithet) in the name of an organism. It can be:

Epithet may also refer to:

a specific epithet:
the second part of a species name in binomial nomenclature in any branch of biology
 in botany, the second part of a botanical name
 Specific epithet (zoology), also called the specific name, meaning the second part of the species name or binomen
a genus, epithet
a subgenus, epithet
in botanical nomenclature:
a Section (botany), epithet
a Series (botany), epithet
a variety (botany), epithet
a forma (botany), epithet
in horticulture:
a cultivar, epithet
a cultivar group epithet, for plants within a species that share characteristics
a grex (horticulture) epithet for cultivated orchids, according to their parentage